In enzymology, a phenylglyoxylate dehydrogenase (acylating) is an enzyme that catalyzes the chemical reaction

phenylglyoxylate + NAD+ + CoA-SH  benzoyl-S-CoA + CO2 + NADH

The three substrates of this enzyme are phenylglyoxylate, NAD+, and CoA-SH, whereas its 3 products are benzoyl-S-CoA, CO2, and NADH.

This enzyme belongs to the family of oxidoreductases, specifically those acting on the aldehyde or oxo group of donor with NAD+ or NADP+ as acceptor.  The systematic name of this enzyme class is phenylglyoxylate:NAD+ oxidoreductase. It has 3 cofactors: FAD, Thiamin diphosphate,  and Iron-sulfur.

References

 

EC 1.2.1
NADH-dependent enzymes
Flavoproteins
Thiamin diphosphate enzymes
Iron-sulfur enzymes
Enzymes of unknown structure